The 1975 international cricket season extended from May to August 1975.

Season overview

June

1975 Cricket World Cup

July

Australia in England

References

1975 in cricket